is a former Japanese football player.

Club statistics

References

External links

1982 births
Living people
People from Noda, Chiba
Komazawa University alumni
Association football people from Chiba Prefecture
Japanese footballers
J1 League players
J2 League players
Japan Football League players
Roasso Kumamoto players
Gamba Osaka players
Tokyo Verdy players
Association football goalkeepers